Talbragar River, a perennial stream that is part of the Macquarie catchment within the Murray–Darling basin, is located in the Orana district of New South Wales, Australia.

The river rises on the western side of the Liverpool Range on south slopes of Great Dividing Range, north of Cassilis and flows generally south west, joined by fifteen tributaries, including the Coolaburragundy River, and reaching its confluence with the Macquarie River near Dubbo; descending  over its  course.

The river flows through the Dunedoo and is noted for its influence on flood, particularly for its capacity for rapid rise and fall, due to the wide catchment, and the effect of its flood water on Dubbo.

European history
The Talbragar River was first encountered by Europeans in the late 1820s when it was called the Putterbatta River. The first bridge over the Talbragar was built in the 1850s, near Dunedoo, by Thomas New.

See also

 Rivers of New South Wales
 List of rivers of Australia
 Talbragar fossil site

References

External links
 

Rivers of New South Wales
Tributaries of the Macquarie River